Marcelo Refresquini (born September 28, 1980 in Montevideo, Uruguay) is a Uruguayan footballer currently playing for Atlético Venezuela of the Primera División in Venezuela.

Teams
  Cerro 2001-2003
  Basañez 2003
  Cerro 2004-2005
  Cúcuta Deportivo 2005
  Deportivo Heredia 2006
  Unión Magdalena 2006-2007
  Manta 2007
  Aragua Fútbol Club 2007-2008
  Carabobo Fútbol Club 2008
  Estrella Roja 2009
  Unión Atlético San Antonio 2009
  Atlético Venezuela 2010–present

Titles
  Cúcuta Deportivo 2005 (Primera B Colombiana)
  Atlético Venezuela 2010 (Segunda División Venezolana)

External links
 Profile at Tenfield Digital Profile at

1980 births
Living people
Uruguayan footballers
Uruguayan expatriate footballers
C.A. Cerro players
Unión Magdalena footballers
Cúcuta Deportivo footballers
Manta F.C. footballers
Aragua FC players
Carabobo F.C. players
Yaracuyanos FC players
Atlético Venezuela C.F. players
Uruguayan Primera División players
Categoría Primera B players
Venezuelan Primera División players
Expatriate footballers in Colombia
Expatriate footballers in Ecuador
Expatriate footballers in Venezuela
Expatriate footballers in Guatemala

Association football forwards